The PIK-5 was a training glider produced in Finland in the 1940s, and 1950s, equipping the country's gliding clubs with an aircraft greater in performance than primary gliders but less than competition sailplanes.

The PIK-5 had a pod-and-boom configuration, with a high, strut-braced monoplane wing and a cruciform tail carried at the end of a tail boom that extended from a position high on the aft end of the pod.

History
The prototype first flew in September 1946, and testing continued until it was badly damaged in a crash in summer 1948 Over the subsequent months, the wings were repaired, and a new fuselage constructed to a revised design. This was completed the following winter, and flights recommenced. However, this aircraft, now known as the PIK-5B, was destroyed in a crash in summer 1951. 

Again, it was rebuilt with modifications, particularly to the wing structure, resulting in the PIK-5C version. This version first flew on 5 July 1952, and went on to become the pattern for around 30 similar machines that would be built over the ensuing years.

Variants
 PIK-5
 PIK 5A
 PIK-5B
 PIK-5C

Specifications (PIK-5C)

Notes

References

 
 
 
 
 

1940s Finnish sailplanes
PIK aircraft
Glider aircraft
Aircraft first flown in 1946
High-wing aircraft